Lukas Dhont (born 11 June 1991) is a Belgian film director and screenwriter. He was featured in Forbes 30 Under 30 Europe list in 2019.

Early life
Dhont was born in Ghent, Belgium. His mother, Hilbe, is a fashion teacher at an art school. He has a younger brother Michiel who is a producer. As a teenager, Dhont worked as a costume design assistant on film and television sets.

Career
He made his feature-length debut in 2018 with Girl, a drama film inspired by the story of Nora Monsecour which focuses on a trans girl pursuing a career as a ballerina. Girl premiered at the 2018 Cannes Film Festival, where it won the Caméra d'Or award for best first feature film, as well as the Queer Palm. It received the André Cavens Award for Best Film given by the Belgian Film Critics Association (UCC) and was selected as the Belgian entry for the Best Foreign Language Film at the 91st Academy Awards. It received nine nominations at the 9th Magritte Awards and won four, including Best Flemish Film and Best Screenplay for Dhont.

Dhont's second feature, Close, starring Émilie Dequenne and Léa Drucker, premiered in competition at the 2022 Cannes Film Festival, where he shared the Grand Prix with Claire Denis' Stars At Noon. It also won the Sydney Film Prize in June 2022. The film is based on his own experiences at school, and tells the story of the friendship between two boys in their early teens. In 2023, the film was nominated for the Academy Award for Best International Feature Film at the 95th Academy Awards.

 Dhont is developing an untitled film with screenwriter Laurent Lunetta.

Awards and nominations

References

External links

1991 births
Living people
Belgian film directors
Belgian screenwriters
People from Ghent
Belgian LGBT screenwriters
LGBT film directors
Magritte Award winners
Directors of Caméra d'Or winners